Videography of Greek singer Katy Garbi.

Music videos
 These are also known as Singles, however they are only released as Radio Singles and Music Videos, not hard copy singles as is common in Greece and Cyprus.

Since 1987, ninety-nine official music videos have been released to complement radio singles spawned by Garbi's commercial releases and other collaborations. Garbi has worked with various music video directors throughout her career including Vicky Velopoulou, Giorgos Kavalos/View Studio, Kostas Kapetanidis, Kostas Sofoulis, Vaggelis Kalaitsis and Manwlis Tzirakis.

1980s

1990s

2000s

2010s

2020s

Video releases
Garbi's video album releases include one DVD music video collection, and studio albums with bonus video material.

Videographies of Greek artists
Videography